"Graves into Gardens" is a song performed by American contemporary worship band Elevation Worship and American contemporary Christian singer-songwriter Brandon Lake which was released as the second single from their eighth live album of the same name, Graves into Gardens (2020), on August 7, 2020. The song was written by Brandon Lake, Chris Brown, Steven Furtick and Tiffany Hammer. Chris Brown and Aaron Robertson handled the production of the single.

"Graves into Gardens" became Elevation Worship's and Brandon Lake's first No. 1 single on the US Hot Christian Songs chart. The song also went on to peak at No. 2 on the Bubbling Under Hot 100 chart, thus becoming the highest-charting single for both acts. It has been certified platinum by Recording Industry Association of America (RIAA). The song won the 2021 Billboard Music Award for Top Christian Song. "Graves into Gardens" won the GMA Dove Award for Worship Recorded Song of the Year, and was nominated for the Song of the Year award, and the Spanish rendition of the song titled "Tumbas A Jardines" for the Spanish Language Recorded Song of the Year award, at the 2021 GMA Dove Awards.

Background
"Graves into Gardens" was initially released by Elevation Worship as the first promotional single from the album Graves into Gardens (2020), on March 13, 2020. On August 7, 2020, Elevation Worship released an EP bundle containing multiple renditions of the song. The song impacted Christian radio stations on August 21, 2020, as the second official single from the album.

On January 8, 2021, Elevation Worship released the album, Graves into Gardens: Morning & Evening which included a new rendition of the song, "Graves into Gardens (Morning & Evening)".

Writing and development
The song was written in 2019, and recorded live at Elevation Church's Ballantyne campus on January 15, 2020, with Brandon Lake featuring on the track as a guest.

In an interview with The Christian Beat, Chris Brown of Elevation Worship shared the story behind the song and why it became the title of the album, saying:

Composition

Accolades

Commercial performance
"Graves into Gardens" debuted at No. 12 on the US Hot Christian Songs chart dated March 28, 2020, concurrently charting at No. 1 on the Christian Digital Song Sales chart. After 28 weeks, the song broke through to the top ten of the Hot Christian Songs chart, peaking at No. 10 due to a gain in digital sales. "Graves into Gardens" went on to peaked at No. 2 on the Hot Christian Songs chart after spending 43 weeks on the chart, and concurrently debuted on the Bubbling Under Hot 100 chart dated January 16, 2021, at No. 5.

The song debuted on the Christian Airplay chart dated August 8, 2020, at No. 44.

"Graves into Gardens" rose to No. 1 on the Hot Christian Songs and Christian Airplay charts dated February 6, 2021. It is the first chart topping single for both acts on the tallies, and the first single to simultaneous reach No. 1 on the Hot Christian Songs and Christian Airplay charts since "Overcomer" by Mandisa last achieved the feat in September 2013. The song also set the record for the longest climb to No. 1 on Hot Christian Songs with 46 weeks, a record previously held by Jeremy Camp's "Let It Fade".

Music videos
On March 13, 2020, Elevation Worship released the live music video of "Graves into Gardens" recorded at Elevation Church's Ballantyne campus on their YouTube channel, The acoustic performance video of the song was published on YouTube by Elevation Worship on March 23, 2020. Elevation Worship availed a Spanish rendition of the song, titled "Tumbas A Jardines" on their YouTube channel on July 10, 2020. The studio version lyric video of "Graves into Gardens" was released by Elevation Worship on August 6, 2020.

Elevation Worship released the music video for "Graves into Gardens (Morning & Evening)" on YouTube on January 8, 2021.

Track listing

Charts

Weekly charts

Year-end charts

Certifications

Release history

Other versions
 American CCM duo Shane & Shane covered the song for its extended play titled The Worship Initiative Vol. 21 (2020).
 Brandon Lake released his own rendition of "Graves into Gardens" on his second studio album, House of Miracles (2020).
 Koryn Hawthorne released a live performance version of the song as part of the Essential Worship Song Sessions series on YouTube.
 Bethel Music released their rendition of the song with Brandon Lake on their studio album, Peace, Vol. II (2021).

References

External links
 

2020 singles
Elevation Worship songs
Brandon Lake songs
2020 songs
Songs written by Brandon Lake
Songs written by Steven Furtick